Jauravia pilosula, is a species of lady beetle native to India, and Sri Lanka.

Description
Body length is about 2.30 to 5 mm. Body sub-hemispherical. Body color ranges from light to deep testaceous. Elytral epipleura is much pale. Head and pronotum covered with fine, deep and fairly close punctures. Interspaces are less bright than those of elytra, and clothed with whiteish short, sparse pubescence. Pronotum moderately emarginate anteriorly with rounded laterally. Elytra very coarsely, deeply and sparsely punctate. Elytral interspaces are smooth and very bright, which is clothed with fine, golden, sparse pubescence. Ventrum very finely and sparsely punctate. Mesosternum, metasteruum and abdominal sternites covered with coarse punctures and fine, yellowish, short, and sparse pubescence.

References 

Coccinellidae
Insects of Sri Lanka
Beetles described in 1900